A pimiento or pimento (or cherry pepper) is a variety of large, red, heart-shaped chili pepper (Capsicum annuum) that measures 3 to 4 in (7 to 10 cm) long and 2 to 3 in (5 to 7 cm) wide (medium, elongate).

Pimientos can have various colours including yellow, green, red, and maroon. Some are green when immature and turn red when they reach maturity.

The flesh of the pimiento is sweet, succulent, and more aromatic than that of the red bell pepper. Some varieties of the pimiento type are hot, including the Floral Gem and Santa Fe Grande varieties. The fruits are typically used fresh or pickled.

Name
Spanish  and Portuguese  both come from Latin  ("pigment; coloring") and came to be used for bell peppers.

Stuffing

"Sweet" (i.e., neither sour nor savory) pimiento peppers are the familiar red stuffing found in prepared Spanish or Greek green olives. Originally, the pimiento was hand-cut into tiny pieces, then hand-stuffed into each olive to balance out the olive's otherwise strong, salty flavor. Despite the popularity of the combination, this production method was very costly and time-intensive. In the industrial era, the cut pimiento was shot by a hydraulic pump into one end of each olive, simultaneously inserting the pimiento in the center while ejecting the pit out the other end.

More recently, for ease of production, pimientos are often puréed then formed into tiny strips, with the help of a natural gum (such as sodium alginate or guar gum). This allows olive stuffing to be mechanized, speeding the process and lowering production costs.

Other uses
Pimientos are commonly used for making pimento cheese. It is also used for making pimento loaf, a type of processed sandwich meat.

See also
List of Capsicum cultivars

References

Webster's Dictionary of the English Language – Unabridged Encyclopedic Edition, Publishers International Press, New York, 1977.

Capsicum cultivars
Chili peppers
Spanish words and phrases